Börje Holmgren (23 August 1909, in Stockholm – 1990) was a Swedish curler.

Teams

References

External links
 
  (look at "HOLMGREN, BÖRJE A")

1909 births
1990 deaths
Sportspeople from Stockholm
Swedish male curlers
Swedish curling champions
20th-century Swedish people